A monarchy is a form of government in which a person, the monarch, is head of state for life or until abdication. The political legitimacy and authority of the monarch may vary from restricted and largely symbolic (constitutional monarchy), to fully autocratic (absolute monarchy), and can expand across the domains of the executive, legislative, and judicial.

The succession of monarchs in many cases has been hereditical, often building dynastic periods. However, elective and self-proclaimed monarchies have also happened. Aristocrats, though not inherent to monarchies, often serve as the pool of persons to draw the monarch from and fill the constituting institutions (e.g. diet and court), giving many monarchies oligarchic elements.

Monarchs can carry various titles such as emperor, empress, king, and queen. Monarchies can form federations, personal unions and realms with vassals through personal association with the monarch, which is a common reason for monarchs carrying several titles.

Monarchies were the most common form of government until the 20th century, by which time republics had replaced many monarchies. Today forty-three sovereign nations in the world have a monarch, including fifteen Commonwealth realms that share King Charles III as their head of state. Other than that, there is a range of sub-national monarchical entities. Most of the modern monarchies tend to be constitutional monarchies, retaining under a constitution unique legal and ceremonial roles for the monarch, exercising limited or no political power, similar to heads of state in a parliamentary republic.

Etymology

It referred to a single at least nominally absolute ruler. In current usage the word monarchy usually refers to a traditional system of hereditary rule, as elective monarchies are quite rare.

History

The similar form of societal hierarchy known as chiefdom or tribal kingship is prehistoric. Chiefdoms provided the concept of state formation, which started with civilizations such as Mesopotamia, Ancient Egypt and the Indus Valley civilization. In some parts of the world, chiefdoms became monarchies. Some of the oldest recorded and evidenced monarchies were Narmer, Pharaoh of Ancient Egypt c. 3100 BCE, and Enmebaragesi, a Sumerian King of Kish c. 2600 BCE.

From earliest records, monarchs could be directly hereditary, while others were elected from among eligible members. With the Egyptian, Indian, Mesopotamian, Sudanic, reconstructed Proto-Indo-European religion, and others, the monarch held sacral functions directly connected to sacrifice and was sometimes identified with having divine ancestry, possibly establishing a notion of the divine right of kings.

Polybius identified monarchy as one of three "benign" basic forms of government (monarchy, aristocracy, and democracy), opposed to the three "malignant" basic forms of government (tyranny, oligarchy, and ochlocracy). The monarch in classical antiquity is often identified as "king" or "ruler" (translating archon, basileus, rex, tyrannos, etc.) or as "queen" (basilinna). Polybius originally understood monarchy as a component of republics, but since antiquity monarchy has contrasted with forms of republic, where executive power is wielded by free citizens and their assemblies. The 4th-century BCE Hindu text Arthasastra laid out the ethics of monarchism. In antiquity, some monarchies were abolished in favour of such assemblies in Rome (Roman Republic, 509 BCE), and Athens (Athenian democracy, 500 BCE).

By the 17th century, monarchy was challenged by evolving parliamentarism e.g. through regional assemblies (such as the Icelandic Commonwealth, the Swiss Landsgemeinde and later Tagsatzung, and the High Medieval communal movement linked to the rise of medieval town privileges) and by modern anti-monarchism e.g. of the temporary overthrow of the English monarchy by the Parliament of England in 1649, the American Revolution of 1776 and the French Revolution of 1789. One of many opponents of that trend was Elizabeth Dawbarn, whose anonymous Dialogue between Clara Neville and Louisa Mills, on Loyalty (1794) features "silly Louisa, who admires liberty, Tom Paine and the US, [who is] lectured by Clara on God's approval of monarchy" and on the influence women can exert on men.

Since then advocacy of the abolition of a monarchy or respectively of republics has been called republicanism, while the advocacy of monarchies is called monarchism. As such republics have become the opposing and alternative form of government to monarchy, despite some having seen infringements through lifelong or even hereditary heads of state, such as in North Korea.

With the rise of republicanism, a diverse division between republicanism developed in the 19th-century politics (such as anti-monarchist radicalism) and conservative or even reactionary monarchism. In the following 20th century many countries abolished the monarchy and became republics, especially in the wake of World War I and World War II.

Today forty-three sovereign nations in the world have a monarch, including fifteen Commonwealth realms that have Charles III as the head of state. Most modern monarchs are constitutional monarchs, who retain a unique legal and ceremonial role but exercise limited or no political power under a constitution. Many are so-called crowned republics, surviving particularly in small states.

In some nations, however, such as Morocco, Qatar, Liechtenstein, and Thailand, the hereditary monarch has more political influence than any other single source of authority in the state, even if it is by a constitutional mandate.

According to a 2020 study, monarchy arose as a system of governance because of an efficiency in governing large populations and expansive territories during periods when coordinating such populations was difficult. The authors argue that monarchy declined as an efficient regime type with innovations in communications and transportation technology, as the efficiency of monarchy relative to other regime types declined.

Characteristics and role

Monarchies are associated with hereditary reign, in which monarchs reign for life and the responsibilities and power of the position pass to their child or another member of their family when they die. Most monarchs, both historically and in the modern-day, have been born and brought up within a royal family, the centre of the royal household and court. Growing up in a royal family (called a dynasty when it continues for several generations), future monarchs are often trained for their expected future responsibilities as monarch.

Different systems of hereditary succession have been used, such as proximity of blood, primogeniture, and agnatic seniority (Salic law). While most monarchs in history have been male, many female monarchs also have reigned. The term "queen regnant" refers to a ruling monarch, while "queen consort" refers to the wife of a reigning king. Rule may be hereditary in practice without being considered a monarchy: there have been some family dictatorships (and also political families) in many democracies.

The principal advantage of hereditary monarchy is the immediate continuity of leadership (as evidenced in the classic phrase "The King is dead. Long live the King!").

Some monarchies are not hereditary. In an elective monarchy, monarchs are elected or appointed by some body (an electoral college) for life or a defined period. Four elective monarchies exist today: Cambodia, Malaysia and the United Arab Emirates are 20th-century creations, while one (the papacy) is ancient.

A self-proclaimed monarchy is established when a person claims the monarchy without any historical ties to a previous dynasty. There are examples of republican leaders who have proclaimed themselves monarchs: Napoleon I of France declared himself Emperor of the French and ruled the First French Empire after having held the title of First Consul of the French Republic for five years from his seizing power in the coup of 18 Brumaire. President Jean-Bédel Bokassa of the Central African Republic declared himself Emperor of the Central African Empire in 1976. Yuan Shikai, the first formal President of the Republic of China, crowned himself Emperor of the short-lived "Empire of China" a few years after the Republic of China was founded.

Powers of the monarch

 In an absolute monarchy, the monarch rules as an autocrat, with absolute power over the state and government—for example, the right to rule by decree, promulgate laws, and impose punishments.
 In a constitutional monarchy, the monarch's power is subject to a constitution. In most current constitutional monarchies, the monarch is mainly a ceremonial figurehead symbol of national unity and state continuity. Although nominally sovereign, the electorate (through the legislature) exercises political sovereignty. Constitutional monarchs' political power is limited. Typical monarchical powers include granting pardons, granting honours, and reserve powers, e.g. to dismiss the prime minister, refuse to dissolve parliament, or veto legislation ("withhold Royal Assent"). They often also have privileges of inviolability and sovereign immunity. A monarch's powers and influence will depend on tradition, precedent, popular opinion, and law.
 Semi-constitutional monarchies exhibit fewer parliamentary powers or simply monarchs with more authority. The term "parliamentary monarchy" may be used to differentiate from semi-constitutional monarchies.
 Monarchical reign has often been linked with military authority. In the late Roman Empire, the Praetorian Guard several times deposed Roman emperors and installed new emperors. Similarly, in the Abbasid Caliphate, the Ghilmans (slave soldiers) deposed Caliphs once they became prominent, allowing new ones to come to power. The Hellenistic kings of Macedon and of Epirus were elected by the army, which was similar in composition to the ecclesia of democracies, the council of all free citizens; military service was often linked with citizenship among the male members of the royal house. The military has dominated the monarch in modern Thailand and in medieval Japan (where a hereditary military chief, the shōgun, was the de facto ruler, although the Japanese emperor nominally reigned). In Fascist Italy, the Savoy monarchy under King Victor Emmanuel III coexisted with the Fascist single-party rule of Benito Mussolini; Romania under the Iron Guard and Greece during the first months of the Colonels' regime were similar. Spain under Francisco Franco was officially a monarchy, although there was no monarch on the throne. Upon his death, Franco was succeeded as head of state by the Bourbon heir, Juan Carlos I, and Spain became a democracy with the king as a figurehead constitutional monarch.

Person of monarch

Most monarchies only have a single person acting as monarch at any given time, although two monarchs have ruled simultaneously in some countries, a situation known as diarchy. Historically this was the case in the ancient Greek city-state of Sparta. There are examples of joint sovereignty of spouses, parent and child or other relatives (such as William III and Mary II in the kingdoms of England and Scotland, Tsars Peter I and Ivan V of Russia, and Charles I and Joanna of Castile).

Andorra currently is the world's only constitutional diarchy, a co-principality. Located in the Pyrenees between Spain and France, it has two co-princes: the bishop of Urgell in Spain (a prince-bishop) and the president of France (derived ex officio from the French kings, who themselves inherited the title from the counts of Foix). It is the only case in which an independent country's (co-)monarch is democratically elected by the citizens of another country.

In a personal union, separate independent states share the same person as monarch, but each realm retains separate laws and government. The fifteen separate Commonwealth realms are sometimes described as being in a personal union with King Charles III as monarch; however, they can also be described as being in a shared monarchy.

A regent may rule when the monarch is a minor, absent, or debilitated.

A pretender is a claimant to an abolished throne or a throne already occupied by somebody else.

Abdication is the act of formally giving up one's monarchical power and status.

Monarchs may mark the ceremonial beginning of their reigns with a coronation or enthronement.

Role of monarch
Monarchy, especially absolute monarchy, is sometimes linked to religious aspects; many monarchs once claimed the right to rule by the will of a deity (Divine Right of Kings, Mandate of Heaven), or a special connection to a deity (sacred king), or even purported to be divine kings, or incarnations of deities themselves (imperial cult). Many European monarchs have been styled Fidei defensor (Defender of the Faith); some hold official positions relating to the state religion or established church.

In the Western political tradition, a morally based, balanced monarchy was stressed as the ideal form of government, and little attention was paid to modern-day ideals of egalitarian democracy: e.g. Saint Thomas Aquinas unapologetically declared: "Tyranny is wont to occur not less but more frequently on the basis of polyarchy [rule by many, i.e. oligarchy or democracy] than on the basis of monarchy." (On Kingship). However, Thomas Aquinas also stated that the ideal monarchical system would also have at lower levels of government both an aristocracy and elements of democracy in order to create a balance of power. The monarch would also be subject to both natural and divine law, and to the Church in matters of religion.

In Dante Alighieri's De Monarchia, a spiritualised, imperial Catholic monarchy is strongly promoted according to a Ghibelline world-view in which the "royal religion of Melchizedek" is emphasised against the priestly claims of the rival papal ideology.

In Saudi Arabia, the king is a head of state who is both the absolute monarch of the country and the Custodian of the Two Holy Mosques of Islam (خادم الحرمين الشريفين).

The roles of monarchs can overlap with other monarchies through personal union or dynastic union, with maybe becoming institutional real union and possibly a larger federal, composite or unitary monarchy, realm and state.

Titles of monarchs

Monarchs can have various titles. Common European titles of monarchs (in that hierarchical order of nobility) are emperor or empress (from Latin: imperator or imperatrix), king or queen, grand duke or grand duchess, prince or princess, duke or duchess. Some early modern European titles (especially in German states) included elector (German: , Prince-Elector, literally "electing prince"), margrave (German: , equivalent to the French title marquis, literally "count of the borderland"), and burgrave (German: , literally "count of the castle"). Lesser titles include count and princely count. Slavic titles include knyaz and tsar (ц︢рь) or tsaritsa (царица), a word derived from the Roman imperial title Caesar.

In the Muslim world, titles of monarchs include caliph (successor to the Islamic prophet Muhammad and a leader of the entire Muslim community), padishah (emperor), sultan or sultana, shâhanshâh (emperor), shah, malik (king) or malikah (queen), emir (commander, prince) or emira (princess), sheikh or sheikha, imam (used in Oman). East Asian titles of monarchs include huángdì (emperor) or nǚhuáng (empress regnant), tiānzǐ (son of heaven), tennō (emperor) or josei tennō (empress regnant), wang (king) or yeowang (queen regnant), hwangje (emperor) or yeoje (empress regnant). South Asian and South East Asian titles included mahārāja (high king) or maharani (high queen), raja (king) and rana (king) or rani (queen) and ratu (South East Asian queen). Historically, Mongolic and Turkic monarchs have used the title khan and khagan (emperor) or khatun and khanum; Ancient Egyptian monarchs have used the title pharaoh for men and women. In Ethiopian Empire, monarchs used title nəgusä nägäst (king of kings) or nəgəstä nägäst (queen of kings).

Many monarchs are addressed with particular styles or manners of address, like "Majesty", "Royal Highness", "By the Grace of God", Amīr al-Mu'minīn ("Leader of the Faithful"), Hünkar-i Khanedan-i Âl-i Osman, "Sovereign of the Sublime House of Osman"), Duli Yang Maha Mulia Seri Paduka Baginda ("Majesty"), Jeonha ("Majesty"), Tennō Heika (literally "His Majesty the heavenly sovereign"), Bìxià ("Bottom of the Steps").

Sometimes titles are used to express claims to territories that are not held in fact (for example, English claims to the French throne), or titles not recognised (antipopes). Also, after a monarchy is deposed, often former monarchs and their descendants are given alternative titles (the King of Portugal was given the hereditary title Duke of Braganza).

Non-sovereign monarchies

A non-sovereign monarchy is one where the monarch is subject to a temporal authority higher than their own. Some are dependent on other powers (see vassals, suzerainty, puppet state, hegemony). In the British colonial era, indirect rule under a paramount power existed, such as the princely states under the British Raj.

In Botswana, South Africa, Ghana and Uganda, the ancient kingdoms and chiefdoms that were met by the colonialists when they first arrived on the continent are now constitutionally protected as regional or sectional entities.

Furthermore, in Nigeria, though the hundreds of sub-regional polities that exist there are not provided for in the current constitution, they are nevertheless legally recognised aspects of the structure of governance that operates in the nation. For example, the Yoruba city-state of Akure in south-western Nigeria is something of an elective monarchy: its reigning Oba Deji has to be chosen by an electoral college of nobles from amongst a finite collection of royal princes of the realm upon the death or removal of an incumbent.

In addition to these five countries, non-sovereign monarchies of varied sizes and complexities exist all over the rest of the continent of Africa.

Statehood
Monarchies pre-date polities like nation states and even territorial states. A nation or constitution is not necessary in a monarchy since a person, the monarch, binds the separate territories and political legitimacy (e.g. in personal union) together.

Monarchies, though, have applied state symbols like insignia or abstracts like the concept of the Crown to create a state identity, which is to be carried and occupied by the monarch, but represents the monarchy even in absence and succession of the monarch.

Nevertheless, monarchies can also be bound to territories (e.g., the King of Norway) and peoples (e.g., the King of the Belgians).

Succession

Hereditary monarchies

In a hereditary monarchy, the position of monarch is inherited according to a statutory or customary order of succession, usually within one royal family tracing its origin through a historical dynasty or bloodline. This usually means that the heir to the throne is known well in advance of becoming monarch to ensure a smooth succession.

Primogeniture, in which the eldest child of the monarch is first in line to become monarch, is the most common system in hereditary monarchy. The order of succession is usually affected by rules on gender. Historically "agnatic primogeniture" or "patrilineal primogeniture" was favoured, that is inheritance according to seniority of birth among the sons of a monarch or head of family, with sons and their male issue inheriting before brothers and their issue, and male-line males inheriting before females of the male line. This is the same as semi-Salic primogeniture. Complete exclusion of females from dynastic succession is commonly referred to as application of the Salic law (see Terra salica).

Before primogeniture was enshrined in European law and tradition, kings would often secure the succession by having their successor (usually their eldest son) crowned during their own lifetime, so for a time there would be two kings in coregency—a senior king and a junior king. Examples were Henry the Young King of England and the early Direct Capetians in France. Sometimes, however, primogeniture can operate through the female line.

In 1980, Sweden became the first European monarchy to declare equal (full cognatic) primogeniture, meaning that the eldest child of the monarch, whether female or male, ascends to the throne. Other kingdoms (such as the Netherlands in 1983, Norway in 1990, Belgium in 1991, Denmark in 2009, and Luxembourg in 2011) have since followed suit. The United Kingdom adopted absolute (equal) primogeniture (subject to the claims of existing heirs) on April 25, 2013, following agreement by the prime ministers of the sixteen Commonwealth Realms at the 22nd Commonwealth Heads of Government Meeting.

In the absence of children, the next most senior member of the collateral line (for example, a younger sibling of the previous monarch) becomes monarch. In complex cases, this can mean that there are closer blood relatives to the deceased monarch than the next in line according to primogeniture. This has often led, especially in Europe in the Middle Ages, to conflict between the principle of primogeniture and the principle of proximity of blood.

Other hereditary systems of succession included tanistry, which is semi-elective and gives weight to merit and Agnatic seniority. In some monarchies, such as Saudi Arabia, succession to the throne first passes to the monarch's next eldest brother, and only after that to the monarch's children (agnatic seniority). However, on June 21, 2017, King Salman of Saudi Arabi revolted against this style of monarchy and elected his son to inherit the throne.

Elective monarchies

In an elective monarchy, monarchs are elected or appointed by somebody (an electoral college) for life or a defined period, but then reign like any other monarch. There is no popular vote involved in elective monarchies, as the elective body usually consists of a small number of eligible people. Historical examples of elective monarchy are the Holy Roman Emperors (chosen by prince-electors but often coming from the same dynasty) and the free election of kings of the Polish–Lithuanian Commonwealth. For example, Pepin the Short (father of Charlemagne) was elected King of the Franks by an assembly of Frankish leading men; nobleman Stanisław August Poniatowski of Poland was an elected king, as was Frederick I of Denmark. Gallic and Germanic peoples also had elective monarchies.

Six forms of elective monarchies exist today. The pope of the Roman Catholic Church (who rules as Sovereign of the Vatican City State) is elected for life by the College of Cardinals. In the Sovereign Military Order of Malta, the Prince and Grand Master is elected for life tenure by the Council Complete of State from within its members. In Malaysia, the federal king, called the Yang di-Pertuan Agong or Paramount Ruler, is elected for a five-year term from among and by the hereditary rulers (mostly sultans) of nine of the federation's constitutive states, all on the Malay peninsula. The United Arab Emirates also chooses its federal leaders from among emirs of the federated states. Furthermore, Andorra has a unique constitutional arrangement as one of its heads of state is the President of the French Republic in the form of a Co-Prince. This is the only instance in the world where the monarch of a state is elected by the citizens of a different country. In New Zealand, the Maori King, head of the Kingitanga Movement, is elected by a council of Maori elders at the funeral of their predecessor, which is also where their coronation takes place. All of the Heads of the Maori King Movement have been descendants of the first Maori King, Potatau Te Wherowhero, who was elected and became King in June 1858. The current monarch is King Tuheitia Potatau Te Wherowhero VII, who was elected and became King on 21 August 2006, the same day as the funeral of his mother, Te Arikinui Dame Te Atairangikaahu, the first Maori Queen. As well as being King and head of the Kingitanga Movement, King Tuheitia is also ex officio the Paramount Chief of the Waikato-Tainui tribe.

Appointment by the current monarch is another system, used in Jordan. It also was used in Imperial Russia; however, it was soon changed to semi-Salic because the instability of the appointment system resulted in an age of palace revolutions. In this system, the monarch chooses the successor, who is always his relative.

Other ways of succession

Other ways to success a monarchy can be through claiming alternative votes (e.g. as in the case of the Western Schism), claims of a mandate to rule (e.g. a popular or divine mandate), military occupation, a coup d'état, a will of the previous monarch or treaties between factions inside and outside of a monarchy (e.g. as in the case of the War of the Spanish Succession).

By accession

The legitimacy and authorities of monarchs are often proclaimed and recognized through occupying and being invested with insignia, seats, deeds and titles, like in the course of coronations.

This is especially employed to legitimize and settle disputed successions, changes in ways of succession, status of a monarch (e.g. as in the case of the privilegium maius deed) or new monarchies altogether (e.g. as in the case of the coronation of Napoleon I).

Dynasties
Succession is often based on the expected continuation of a dynastic period or association in a dynastic union, which is sometimes challenged by diverging lineage and legitimism.

Succession crisis

In cases of succession challenges, it can be instrumental for pretenders to secure or install legitimacy through the above, for example proof of accession like insignia, through treaties or a claim of a divine mandate to rule (e.g. by Hong Xiuquan and his Taiping Heavenly Kingdom).

Current monarchies 

Currently, there are 43 nations and a population of roughly half a billion people in the world with a monarch as head of state. They fall roughly into the following categories:

Commonwealth realms 
King Charles III is, separately, monarch of fifteen Commonwealth realms (Antigua and Barbuda, the Commonwealth of Australia, the Commonwealth of the Bahamas, Belize, Canada, Grenada, Jamaica, New Zealand, the Independent State of Papua New Guinea, the Federation of Saint Christopher and Nevis, Saint Lucia, Saint Vincent and the Grenadines, the Solomon Islands, Tuvalu and the United Kingdom of Great Britain and Northern Ireland). They evolved out of the British Empire into fully independent states within the Commonwealth of Nations that retain the King as head of state. All fifteen realms are constitutional monarchies and full democracies where the King has limited powers or a largely ceremonial role. The King is head of the Church of England (the established church of England), while the other 14 realms do not have a state religion.

Other European constitutional monarchies 
The Principality of Andorra, the Kingdom of Belgium, the Kingdom of Denmark, the Grand Duchy of Luxembourg, the Kingdom of the Netherlands, the Kingdom of Norway, the Kingdom of Spain, and the Kingdom of Sweden are fully democratic states in which the monarch has a limited or largely ceremonial role. In some cases, there is a Christian religion established as the official church in each of these countries. This is the Lutheran form of Protestantism in Norway, Sweden, and Denmark, while Andorra is a Roman Catholic country. Spain, Belgium, and the Netherlands have no official state religion. Luxembourg, which is predominantly Roman Catholic, has five so-called officially recognized cults of national importance (Roman Catholicism, Protestantism, Greek Orthodoxy, Judaism, and Islam), a status which gives those religions some privileges like the payment of a state salary to their priests.

Andorra is unique among all existing monarchies, as it is a diarchy, with the co-princes being shared by the president of France and the bishop of Urgell. This situation, based on historical precedence, has created a peculiar situation among monarchies, as:
 neither of the co-princes is of Andorran descent;
 one is elected by citizens of a foreign country (France), but not by Andorrans as they cannot vote in the French presidential elections; and
 the other, the bishop of Urgell, is appointed by a foreign head of state, the pope.

European semi constitutional monarchies
A semi-constitutional monarchy is a monarchy where the monarch rules according to a democratic constitution but still retains substantial powers. The Principality of Liechtenstein and the Principality of Monaco are European semi constitutional monarchies. For example, the 2003 Constitution referendum gave the Prince of Liechtenstein the power to veto any law that the Landtag (parliament) proposes, while the Landtag can veto any law that the Prince tries to pass. The prince can appoint or dismiss any elective member or government employee. However, he is not an absolute monarch, as the people can call for a referendum to end the monarch's reign. When Hereditary Prince Alois threatened to veto a referendum to legalize abortion in 2011, it came as a surprise because the prince had not vetoed any law for over 30 years. The prince of Monaco has simpler powers; he cannot appoint or dismiss any elective member or government employee to or from his or her post, but he can elect the minister of state, government council and judges. Both Albert II, Prince of Monaco, and Hans-Adam II, Prince of Liechtenstein, are theoretically very powerful within their small states, but they have very limited power compared to the Islamic monarchs (see below). They also own huge tracts of land and are shareholders in many companies.

Monarchies in the Muslim world
The monarchies of the Kingdom of Bahrain, the Brunei Darussalam, the Hashemite Kingdom of Jordan, the State of Kuwait, Malaysia, the Kingdom of Morocco, the Sultanate of Oman, the State of Qatar, the Kingdom of Saudi Arabia, and the United Arab Emirates generally retain far more powers than their European or Commonwealth counterparts. Brunei Darussalam, Oman, and Saudi Arabia remain absolute monarchies; Bahrain, Kuwait, and United Arab Emirates are classified as mixed, meaning there are representative bodies of some kind, but the monarch retains most of his powers. Jordan, Malaysia, and Morocco are constitutional monarchies, but their monarchs still retain more substantial powers than European equivalents.

East and Southeast Asian constitutional monarchies
The kingdoms of Bhutan, Cambodia, Thailand, and Japan are constitutional monarchies where the monarch has a limited or merely ceremonial role. Bhutan made the change in 2008. Cambodia had its own monarchy after independence from the French colonial empire, but it was deposed after the Khmer Rouge came into power. The monarchy was subsequently restored in the peace agreement of 1993. Thailand transitioned into a constitutional monarchy over the course of the 20th Century. Japan has had a monarchy, an emperor, according to legend, since Emperor Jimmu (reigned 660-585 BCE), making it the world's oldest existing monarchy. After their defeat in the Second World War, Japan made great strides in limiting the power of the Emperor, giving most of it to the democratically elected National Diet.

Other monarchies
Five monarchies do not fit into any of the above groups by virtue of geography or class of monarchy: the Kingdom of Tonga in Polynesia; the Kingdom of Eswatini and the Kingdom of Lesotho in Africa and the Vatican City State in Europe. Of these, Lesotho and Tonga are constitutional monarchies, while Eswatini and the Vatican City are absolute monarchies.

Eswatini is unique among these monarchies, often being considered a diarchy: the King, or Ngwenyama, rules alongside his mother, the Ndlovukati, as dual heads of state. This was originally intended to provide a check on political power. The Ngwenyama, however, is considered the administrative head of state, while the Ndlovukati is considered the spiritual and national head of state, a position which more or less has become symbolic in recent years.

The Pope is the absolute monarch of the Vatican City State (a separate entity from the Holy See) by virtue of his position as head of the Roman Catholic Church and Bishop of Rome; he is an elected rather than a hereditary ruler, and does not have to be a citizen of the territory prior to his election by the cardinals.

The Order of Malta describes itself as a "sovereign subject" based on its unique history and unusual present circumstances, but its exact status in international law is a subject of debate.

In Samoa, the position of head of state is described in Part III of the 1960 Samoan constitution. At the time the constitution was adopted, it was anticipated that future heads of state would be chosen from among the four Tama a 'Aiga "royal" paramount chiefs. However, this is not required by the constitution, and, for this reason, Samoa can be considered a republic rather than a constitutional monarchy.

The ruling Kim family in North Korea (Kim Il-sung, Kim Jong-il and Kim Jong-un) has been described as a de facto absolute monarchy or a "hereditary dictatorship". In 2013, Clause 2 of Article 10 of the new edited Ten Fundamental Principles of the Korean Workers' Party states that the party and revolution must be carried "eternally" by the "Baekdu (Kim's) bloodline". This though does not mean it is a de jure absolute monarchy, as the country's name is the Democratic Republic of Korea.

The al-Assad ruling Syria (Hafez al-Assad and Bashar al-Assad ) have also been described as a de facto absolute monarchy or a "hereditary dictatorship". After the death of Hafez Al-Assad in 2000, the Constitution of Syria was amended for the minimum age of the President to change from 40 to 34, which allowed 34 year old Bashar al-Assad to become president. This though does not mean it is a de jure absolute monarchy, as the country's name is the Syrian Arab Republic.

Long form titles for the country 

 Federation: ,  (de facto)
 Commonwealth: , 
 Sultanate: 
 Nation: 
 Grand Duchy: 
 Independent State: 
 Emirate: 

See also 

 Absolute monarchy
 Abolition of monarchy
 Autocracy
 Cloistered rule
 Criticism of monarchy
 Diarchy
 Empire
 Family as a model for the state
 Federal monarchy
 Hereditary monarchy
 List of current constituent monarchs
 List of current monarchies
 List of current monarchs of sovereign states
 List of living former sovereign monarchs
 List of fictional monarchs
 List of monarchies
 List of monarchs by nickname
 List of royalty by net worth
 List of usurpers
 Monarchism
 Order of succession
 President for life
 Pretender
 Personal union
 Royal and noble ranks
 Universal monarchy

Notes and references

Notes

References

External links 

 The Constitutional Monarchy Association in the UK
 

 
Positions of authority
Titles
Constitutional state types
Political systems